These are the results of the boys' C1 sprint event at the 2010 Summer Youth Olympics.  It took place at the Marina Reservoir. Time Trial Round was on August 21, 2010. First elimination round, repechage and third round took place on August 21, and quarterfinals, semifinals and medals rounds were on August 22.

Medalists

Time Trial

First round
The winners advanced to the 3rd round along with the first placed athlete at the Time Trial. Losers raced at the repechages.

Match 1

Match 2

Match 3

Match 4

Match 5

Match 6

Match 7

Repechage
The winners and fastest loser advanced to the 3rd round.

Repechage 1

Repechage 2

Repechage 3

Third round
The winners and two fastest losers advanced to the 4th round.

Match 1

Match 2

Match 3

Match 4

Match 5

Match 6

Quarterfinals

Match 1

Match 2

Match 3

Match 4

Semifinals

Match 1

Match 2

Finals

Match 1

Match 2

References
Time Trial
First Round
Repechage
Third Round
Quarterfinals
Semifinals
Finals

Canoeing at the 2010 Summer Youth Olympics